The Arnewood School is a mixed secondary school and sixth form located in New Milton in the English county of Hampshire.

The school was converted to academy status on 1 April 2011. It used to be a Foundation School with Technology College status, directly controlled by Hampshire County Council. However Arnewood continues to coordinate with Hampshire County Council for admissions.

The Arnewood School offers GCSEs, Level 2 BTECs and a Level 2 VTCT as programmes of study for KS4 pupils. Students in the sixth form have the option to study from a range of A Levels, Level 3 BTECs and a Level 2 VTCT. The school was judged as "outstanding" by Ofsted in January 2013. It was judged as "good" by Ofsted in October 2018.

References

External links
The Arnewood School official website

Secondary schools in Hampshire
Academies in Hampshire